Errich Raffl (sometimes shown as Erich Raffl) is an Austrian luger who competed in the 1950s. At the 1957 FIL World Luge Championships in Davos, Switzerland, he won bronze medals both in the men's singles and men's doubles event.

Raffl also won three medals at the European luge championships with one silver (Men's doubles: 1956) and two bronzes (Men's singles: 1956, Men's doubles: 1953).

References
Hickok sports information on World champions in luge and skeleton.
List of European luge champions 

Austrian male lugers
Possibly living people
Year of birth missing